Orpheus Island National Park is a national park on Orpheus Island, in North Queensland, Australia. The Aboriginal (possibly Nyawaygi)  name for this island is Goolboddi Island. Orpheus Island is a continental island.

Prior to the arrival of Europeans, Orpheus Island was inhabited by an Aboriginal people, probably the Nyawigi people. The name "Orpheus" was given to the island in 1887 by Lieutenant G. E. Richards, referring to HMS Orpheus, a Royal Navy ship which was wrecked off the coast of New Zealand in 1863.

In 1960 it was declared a national park.  In 2002 the island was bought by Jim Wilson who had developed the Freycinet Lodge in Tasmania, and bought off him in 2011 by Chris Morris, the Computershare mogul.

A research station, operated by James Cook University, is located on the island. Since 2000, St Michael's Grammar School (of St Kilda, Victoria) has run a marine biology project each June. Since 2018 Reef Ecologic has run an annual reef restoration and leadership workshop at the research station. The group published a research paper on findings from citizen scientists on a rare, large coral bommie at Orpheus Island in 2021 A citizen science database using iNaturalist has recorded over 700 observations of 334 species with the most observed species the Australian Green Tree Frog 

There is also a luxury resort on the island, the Orpheus Island Great Barrier Reef Luxury Resort.

Great Palm Island is the closest location with government facilities.

See also

 List of islands of Queensland
 Protected areas of Queensland

References

External links

 

National parks of Queensland
Islands on the Great Barrier Reef
Townsville
Protected areas established in 1960
1960 establishments in Australia
Great Palm Island group